The Tennessee Lady Volunteers basketball team represents the University of Tennessee in Knoxville, Tennessee in NCAA women's basketball competition. The team has been a contender for national titles for over thirty years, having made every NCAA Women's Division I Basketball Championship tournament since the NCAA began sanctioning women's sports in the 1981–82 season.

The team is frequently referred to as the Lady Vols; the formal "Volunteers" nickname is regularly shortened by many fans of both men's and women's teams to "Vols." The university considers either "Lady Volunteers" or "Lady Vols" acceptable.

The Lady Vols have won at least a share of the SEC regular season championship 17 times (with the most recent occurrence being in 2015), won 17 SEC tournament championships (with the most recent occurrence being in 2014), made 18 Final Four appearances (with the most recent occurrence being in 2008), and won 8 national championships (with the most recent being in 2008).

Overview

The Lady Vols were coached by Pat Summitt for over four decades. Under Summitt, the Lady Vols won numerous SEC titles, appeared in 18 NCAA Final Fours and 4 AIAW Final Fours, and won 8 NCAA titles including an undefeated season. Additionally, Tennessee is the only team to have appeared in all 36 NCAA Tournaments, including 34 Sweet 16s (23 of which were consecutive). Summitt's teams were known for participating in a grueling regular season schedule, often toughest in the nation, in order to prepare the team for the NCAA tournament. This tough schedule has caused Tennessee to build up rivalries with many prominent teams, including Texas, Stanford, Louisiana Tech, Old Dominion, and, most notably, Connecticut. Like other Tennessee teams, the Lady Vols compete in the SEC, which is historically a competitive conference producing several NCAA Championship teams this century.
Within the conference, Tennessee's main rivals are LSU, Vanderbilt, Kentucky and Georgia, with the series vs. South Carolina and Mississippi State gaining importance due to the emergence of those schools as national powers. Summitt led Tennessee to 1098 victories, with an 84.2% win rate. The numbers at home are even stronger, as Tennessee has won 91% of home games and 93.1% of in-conference home games.

Current roster

History

Early years
Lady Vols basketball began at the beginning of the 20th century. However, most "seasons" consisted of three or four games. The sport was dropped in 1926 and was not picked up again until 1960. Coach Joan Cronan went 8–10 over two seasons before being replaced by Margaret Hutson, who coached for four years with a 60–18 record.

In 1974, Pat Head was named the new coach. Head had previously played women's basketball for the UT-Martin Pacers (now known as the Skyhawks), and had just graduated.

Late 1970s
In the 1974–1975 season, Pat Head took over a 25–2 Lady Vols team. In her opening season, the Lady Vols won the TCWSF Eastern District Championship for the third straight year. However, the team finished only 4th overall in the TCWSF (they had been 2nd the previous two years), and were not invited to the AIAW women's basketball tournament. After finishing 16–11 her second season, Head directed two 20-win teams, winning back-to-back AIAW Region-II championships. 1978 included the Lady Vols defeating 3-time AIAW champion Delta State by 20, and Tennessee's first number one ranking. 1978 saw the Lady Vols participate in their first AIAW Final Four, where they finished 3rd. Head also recorded her 100th win during this season, a 79–66 victory over NC State. Tennessee finished up the 1970s by winning the first ever SEC tournament, and returning to the Final Four, where they finished runner-up to Old Dominion, 68–53.

1980s
During the 1980–1981 season, the Lady Vols went 25–6, and avenged their championship game loss to Old Dominion by defeating them three times. The team made it to the AIAW Final Four for the third straight year, but wound up as runner-up for the second consecutive year, losing to Louisiana Tech, 79–59. The coach was now known as Pat Summitt, having married Ross Barnes Summitt II in 1980.

The 1981–1982 season featured the first ever NCAA Women's basketball tournament. The Lady Vols were one of 32 teams invited and named a 2 seed in their region. In the region championship, the Lady Vols upset first seeded USC 91–90 in overtime to advance to the Final Four. They would lose their Final Four match-up with Louisiana Tech who ended up winning the tournament.

The next season, the Lady Vols won the regular season SEC title, but fell in the SEC tournament to Georgia. Tennessee was invited to the now-36 team NCAA tournament and was given their first ever 1 seed. Tennessee made it to the regional championship, but fell to Georgia again, 67–63. Summitt won her 200th game on December 3, a 69–56 victory over St. John's during the Coca-Cola Classic in Detroit.

The 1983–1984 season saw Tennessee start out poorly, 6–4. However, Summitt got her team together and finished 22–10, for her 8th straight 20-win season, a streak that is still on-going. Tennessee not only made it to the NCAA Final Four for the second time out of the three tournaments, but also made it to the title game. However, Tennessee lost by 11 to USC, who had also won the title the previous year. Pat Summitt earned Coach of the Year honors. This season was followed up by another 20-win year in which Tennessee earned both the regular season SEC title (despite only going 4–4) and the tournament title. However, the Lady Vols fell in the NCAA tournament to Mississippi during the Round of 16. The next season was a similar story—the Lady Vols had a decent regular season, played a great tournament (reaching the Final Four for the second time in three years), but fell before winning the title.

In 1986–1987, after years of trying, the Lady Vols finally broke through and defeated perennial power Louisiana Tech for their first title, 67–44. The Lady Techsters had defeated the Lady Vols by 12 earlier in the season. Tennessee's Tonya Edwards earned the honor of Most Outstanding Player in the Final Four. During this season, Summitt also earned her 300th win, an 87–66 victory over North Carolina. The next year, the Lady Vols were poised to repeat, as the third-ranked and top seeded Tennessee made it to the Final Four yet again. However, Louisiana Tech avenged their championship loss with a nine-point win, and went on to win the title.

In 1988–1989, the Lady Vols made it to the Final Four for the fourth straight year, and as a one-seed for the second straight year. After dispatching Maryland by 12, Tennessee faced SEC rival Auburn for the title. Auburn had lost by two to Louisiana Tech in the title game the previous year, and had been given its only loss in the SEC Championship. However, that loss was to Tennessee, who managed a 15-point victory over the Tigers. The championship game was similar, and Tennessee took home its second title in three years with a 76–60 victory. Record-wise, this was Tennessee's best season yet, as they won 35 games while dropping only 2, one to Auburn in the regular season and the other a two-point loss to Texas. Additionally, the Lady Vols won every NCAA tournament game by at least twelve points.

In the final season of the decade, the Lady Vols started off the season well, winning the SEC title. However, the team fell by one to Auburn in the SEC Championship, and then lost in overtime to Virginia in the regional finals, one game shy of making a trip to the Final Four, which was being held in Knoxville. Summitt did accomplish another milestone during this season, however—her 400th win, a 70–69 victory over South Carolina on January 25.

1990s
Despite winning neither the SEC regular season championship nor the tournament championship, Tennessee was given a 1 seed in the 1991 NCAA tournament. After a close win in the regional semifinals against Western Kentucky, Tennessee dispatched Auburn for the second time in three years. In the national semifinals, the Lady Vols beat Stanford, 68–60, to earn the opportunity to avenge the previous year's tournament loss against Virginia. Just as the prior year's game had gone into overtime, so did this one. Down one at the half, the Lady Vols managed to tie the game at 60 by the end of regulation. Tennessee escaped in overtime with a 70–67 win, and their third national title in five years. However, the next year the Lady Vols did not even make it to the regional championship, falling to the same Western Kentucky team they had beaten in the same round the previous tournament, 75–70. The 1992–93 season was better, as Tennessee defeated the defending champions Stanford twice, and swept the SEC season for the first time ever. However, the Lady Vols were unable to win the tournament title, and also fell in the NCAA tournament to Iowa, a 72–56 loss in the regional finals.

Early in the 1993–1994 season, Summitt grabbed her 500th win, an 80–45 beating of Ohio State on November 21. Tennessee also won both the regular season and tournament conference titles. However, the streak of years without a Final Four appearance extended to three with a 71–68 loss in the regional semifinals to Louisiana Tech. The next season would be Tennessee's return to the Final Four. Tennessee ran the table in the SEC regular season for the third straight year, but also failed to win the tournament title for the third straight year. The top-seed Lady Vols breezed their way to their fifth national championship game, with no game being closer than 21. However, in the National Championship, the Lady Vols fell to the undefeated UConn Huskies, 70–64. During the off-season, Pat Summitt signed high school standout Chamique Holdsclaw.

In 1995–1996, with freshman Holdsclaw and senior Michelle M. Marciniak, the Lady Vols won the SEC tournament and made a second straight Final Four. The other three teams: UConn, Stanford, and Georgia, had all defeated the Lady Vols in the regular season. In the semi-finals, facing the UConn Huskies who had knocked them off for the title the previous year, the Lady Vols shot out to an 11-point lead. However, UConn cut it to 4 by the half, and tied later on. With 12 seconds to go, Tennessee led by three, but the Huskies hit a three to send the game into overtime. This was not enough though, as UT prevailed by 5 in overtime. The championship game was not that close as Tennessee won their fourth title easily, an 83–65 win over Georgia.

With regard to record, the 1996–1997 season was one of Summitt's worst seasons ever. In addition to losses to powerhouses such as Louisiana Tech (twice), Stanford, Old Dominion, and Connecticut, Tennessee also lost to teams such as Florida, against whom they had been previously undefeated. After their tenth loss of the season, in the SEC semi-finals to Auburn, the team pulled together in time for the NCAA tournament. Avenging their loss to undefeated Connecticut, Tennessee continued on their way to the championship game, where they redressed another loss, defeating Old Dominion by 9 for their second straight national title. Summitt also earned her 600th win during the season, a 15-point victory over Marquette on November 23, 1996.

In many aspects, the 1997–1998 team was Summitt's best. With the top-ranked recruiting class as well as Holdsclaw, the Lady Vols ran the table to a 39–0 season while playing one of the top-ranked schedules in the country. Only three teams came within 10 points of beating them, and the Lady Vols won a 93–75 victory over Louisiana Tech for their third straight national championship.

Chamique Holdsclaw had declared that the 1998–99 team would be the greatest ever. However, this proved not to be the case. Injuries to several players decimated the team, and the Lady Vols ultimately fell to Duke in the regional finals. With this, the Chamique Holdsclaw era ended. A landmark was set during this season however, as "The Meeks"—Holdsclaw, Tamika Catchings, and Semeka Randall—became the first trio from one team to be named Kodak All-Americans.

The Lady Vols ended the decade with their third straight 30-win season, third straight SEC title, and third straight SEC Tournament title. Additionally, the Lady Vols defeated UConn in the regular season, 72–71, in what would ultimately be the Huskies' only loss of the year. In the NCAA tournament, Tennessee breezed its way to the title game, winning all 5 games by at least ten points. However, in the championship the Lady Vols fell to the Huskies, by a 71–52 score. During the season, Summitt earned her 700th win, 85–62 at Wisconsin.

At the 2000 ESPY Awards, the Lady Vols basketball team was named co-team of the decade, along with the Florida State Seminoles football team. Additionally, Pat Summitt was named the Naismith Coach of the Century, and Chamique Holdsclaw earned recognition as player of the century.

2000s
In the 2000–2001 season, the Lady Vols claimed another SEC title, winning all 14 SEC games. Additionally, they split the season series with the UConn Huskies and headed into the SEC tournament with a 28–1 record. However, the Lady Vols were upset by Vanderbilt in the semifinals, and then lost in the Sweet Sixteen to Xavier, their worst finish since 1993–1994. Despite this, Pat Summitt earned her 750th win, in the second game against UConn, a 92–88 victory. Additionally, the team finished with their fourth straight 30-win season.

The 2001–2002 season marked the first time since the beginning of the rivalry that Tennessee and Connecticut played each other only once in the regular season. UConn won this match-up by 14. However they would see each other later in the tournament. Tennessee suffered other losses during the season, losing to Texas by a point and getting badly beaten by the Duke Blue Devils. Additionally, despite winning their fifth straight SEC championship, the Lady Vols fell once again in the tournament, this time to LSU. In the NCAA tournament, Tennessee was able to reach the Final Four yet again, with a 5-point win over Vanderbilt. This trip to the Final Four marked Summitt's 13th appearance, which broke Coach John Wooden's record of 12, as well as her 788th win, which tied her with Jody Conradt for winningest coach in women's basketball history. However, the Lady Vols fell in the national semifinals to Connecticut. This loss ended the season at 29–5, one win shy of extending Summitt's streak of 30-win seasons. Summitt did achieve more milestones during this season. A 106–66 win over USC marked her 200th win at home, a victory against Louisiana Tech was her 300th win against a ranked opponent and her 93–65 win over Arkansas was her 1,000th game as a coach, including international contests.

During the 2002–2003 season, the Lady Vols compiled their 6th perfect SEC season, and additionally beat powerhouses Duke and Louisiana Tech among others. However, the Lady Vols dropped their second straight to Texas and lost yet another game in the series against UConn. This streak would continue as the Lady Vols made it to the title game only to lose to the Huskies again, 73–68. During the season, Summitt earned her 800th win, 76–57 over DePaul, and was the fastest coach to reach this milestone.

The 2003–2004 season was quite similar to the previous year. The Lady Vols defeated most of their opponents, including Duke and Louisiana Tech, but dropped games to UConn and Texas. The Lady Vols again went 14–0 in the regular season against SEC competition and again fell in the tournament. And once again, the Lady Vols won five games in the NCAA tournament only to lose in the championship game to Connecticut.

By 2004–2005, Connecticut's Diana Taurasi had finally graduated and Tennessee was able to break their losing streak against Connecticut with a 68–67 victory. As Taurasi left, Tennessee received Candace Parker, a highly regarded and nationally known player. However, due to injuries, she was redshirted and did not play that year. Tennessee suffered losses during the season to Duke, Rutgers, and LSU, while beating teams which included Stanford and Louisiana Tech. LSU's win over Tennessee gave the Tigers the SEC title, breaking Tennessee's streak of 7 straight. However Tennessee was able to break their streak of four years without a tournament title, by avenging their loss with a 67–65 victory over LSU in the SEC Championship. In the NCAA tournament, Tennessee defeated the Rutgers team which had beaten them earlier in the year to advance to their fourth Final Four in a row. In the Final Four, the Lady Vols fell to Michigan State by a mark of 68–64. Tennessee had led by 16 at one point, but the Spartans made a record-tying come back to advance to the title game. In the second round of the NCAA tournament, the Lady Vols defeated Purdue. This victory gave Pat Summitt her 880th win, breaking North Carolina coach Dean Smith's record of 879 wins, making her the all-time winningest coach in NCAA history.

2005–2006 was Candace Parker's first year as a college athlete. After being redshirted the previous year she was recovered from her injuries and became a starter. During the season, the Lady Vols dropped three games to SEC foes LSU, Florida, and Kentucky, their worst SEC season since the 1996–1997 season. The Lady Vols also suffered a bad loss to Duke. However they won their second straight game against Connecticut and rebounded from the poor SEC season to win the tournament for the second year in a row. In the tournament, Tennessee controversially received a two seed instead of the one seed Summitt believed her team deserved, and in the regional finals played North Carolina. Parker tied Ivory Latta for leading scorer with 20 points, but it was not enough. Tennessee trailed from the beginning, falling behind by as many as 16. Late in the second half, the Lady Vols were able to cut the lead down to five, but ultimately fell, 75–63. This loss meant that for the first time in five years Summitt would not be appearing in the Final Four.

Early in the 2006–2007 season, Tennessee defeated three ranked teams in a row, Stanford, Arizona State, and Middle Tennessee. After Tennessee lost to the North Carolina Tar Heels again, by 13, the Lady Vols defeated a strong Notre Dame team and defeated UConn for the third time in a row. In Knoxville, Summitt's team fell to top-ranked Duke, 74–70, in a game which Duke scored the first 19 points, with Tennessee not scoring for nearly the first six minutes. Later, in Baton Rouge, the Lady Vols clinched the SEC title against LSU in a game where Candace Parker scored 27. However, in the tournament semifinals, Tennessee fell to the Tigers. In that second game, Parker only scored 4 points. In the NCAA tournament, Summitt's team easily made it to the Final Four, dispatching teams that included SEC foe Mississippi and 13-seeded Cinderella, Marist, winning each game by at least 14. In the Final Four, Tennessee again faced North Carolina. Despite shooting just 27%, the team came back from a 12-point deficit with 8:18 remaining to win, 56–50. In the championship game against Rutgers, Tennessee finally won its seventh title. Down by 11 at the half, Rutgers mounted a small comeback, taking the lead down to 7 with 13:33, only to have Shannon Bobbitt hit three three-pointers. Rutgers responded with a 7–0 run, cutting the lead down to 8, but Parker hit 6 free throws to ice the win for Tennessee.

The 2007–08 season started off with the top-ranked Lady Vols going 3–0, including wins over 9th-ranked Oklahoma and 22nd-ranked Texas. The win over Texas was Summitt's 950th. After two more wins, #1 Tennessee knocked off fourth-ranked North Carolina, 83–79, in a rematch of a Final Four match-up last year, to advance to 6–0 on the season.
Tennessee won their next four games, then headed out to California for a match-up with 5th-ranked Stanford. Down 4 with less than 30 seconds remaining, the Lady Vols managed to tie the game up and send it to overtime, but still lost, 73–69.
The Lady Vols responded by winning their next seven games, giving them a 17–1 record going into a match-up with Duke. Candace Parker's 17 points and 12 rebounds, including a bucket with 22 seconds remaining, helped the Lady Vols defeat the Blue Devils for the first time in four years, 67–64. After winning their next three games, all against SEC opponents, the Lady Vols met with a top-5 Rutgers squad who had just defeated top-ranked UConn. Down 5 with under 90 seconds remaining, the Lady Vols hit back-to-back threes pointers to regain the lead, but Rutgers' Carson responded with a jumper to give Rutgers a one-point lead. On the other end, Candace Parker missed a shot with time winding down. Tennessee's Nicky Anosike got the rebound and was fouled, sending her to the free throw line where she made both free throws to give Tennessee a one-point victory. However, the finish proved to be controversial, as replays revealed that the game clock had paused with 0.2 seconds remaining, giving Anosike enough time to be fouled. In the following game, against LSU, Tennessee soared out to a 21–2 lead, but led only 33–30 at halftime. In the second half, the Lady Tigers took a quick lead, and never looked back, winning 78–62. Tennessee won the remainder of its regular season games and finished second in the SEC, giving them a first-round bye in the conference tournament. The Lady Vols went on to win the SEC tournament, defeating LSU.(61–55)

Tennessee advanced to their 18th Final Four, defeating LSU by only one point to advance to a second consecutive NCAA tournament championship Game. The Lady Vols defeated the 2-seeded Stanford Cardinal 64–48 to take home their 8th National Championship.

In 2009 the team had a rebuilding season, due to the departure of the first pick in the 2008 WNBA Draft Candace Parker. They finished the season at 22–11 and entered the NCAA tournament with the lowest seeding in the program's history at #5. In the opening round of the tournament they played a 26–8 Ball State Cardinals team that was making their NCAA tourney debut. Ball State would go on to win the game 71–55 making history. The Lady Volunteers had never lost in the first two rounds of the tournament, going 42–0 through the years. Tennessee also became the first defending champ to lose its opening game in the women's tourney.

2010s
On April 18, 2012, Head Coach Pat Summitt (née Head, she had married Ross Barnes Summitt II in 1980) announced that she would be stepping down as coach but remain with the team as a head coach emeritus following her 38 years with the team and recent diagnosis of dementia. Assistant Coach Holly Warlick was announced to be moving up to fill the head coaching position for the Lady Vols Basketball team. The Lady Vols earned their 17th SEC tournament championship as they defeated Kentucky 71–70 on March 9, 2014.

On March 27, 2019, Warlick was fired. On April 9, Kellie Harper was hired as head coach.

Head coaches
Prior to 1971, records are incomplete.
Katherine Williams, Captain, 1903 (0–2)
Jenny Morrill, Captain, 1904, (0–2)
Leo Thedore Bellmonts, 1905 (0–4)
Essie Polk, captain, 1906 (0–3)
Thomas Snoddy Myers, 1907 (1–1)
Willard C. Burnley, 1908 (1–2)
Andrew Weisenburg, 1909 (1–1–1)
Howard Sandburg, 1910 (0–2)
Mary Douglas Ayres, 1920 (2–3)
Mabel Miller, 1922–1923 (4–2)
Fay Morgan, 1924 (4–3)
Ann Huddle, 1925–1926 (12–4–1)
Nancy Lay, 1960–1968 (No results available)
Joan Cronan, 1969–1970 (8–10)
Margaret Hutson, 1971–1974 (60–18) — 2 TCWSF Eastern District Championships
Pat Summitt, 1974–2012 (1098–208) — 8 NCAA Championships, 16 SEC Regular Season Championships, 16 SEC tournament championships
Holly Warlick, 2012–2019 (172–67) – 2 SEC Regular Season Championships, 1 SEC tournament championship
Kellie Harper, 2019–present (36–16)

Retired jerseys

Player awards

National awards

USBWA National Freshman of the Year
Shekinna Stricklen – 2009
NCAA basketball tournament Most Outstanding Player
Tonya Edwards – 1987
Bridgette Gordon – 1989
Michelle M. Marciniak – 1996
Chamique Holdsclaw – 1997, 1998
Candace Parker – 2007, 2008
Naismith College Player of the Year
Chamique Holdsclaw – 1998, 1999
Tamika Catchings – 2000
Candace Parker – 2008
Wade Trophy
Daedra Charles – 1991
Candace Parker – 2007
John R. Wooden Award
Candace Parker – 2007, 2008
Associated Press Women's College Basketball Player of the Year
Chamique Holdsclaw – 1998, 1999
Tamika Catchings – 2000
Candace Parker – 2007, 2008
Frances Pomeroy Naismith Award
Kara Lawson – 2003

SEC Awards
Player of the Year Award
Bridgette Gordon – 1989
Dena Head – 1992
Nikki McCray – 1994, 1995
Chamique Holdsclaw – 1998, 1999
Candace Parker – 2007
Shekinna Stricklen – 2011
Meighan Simmons – 2013

Prominent players
Following the Lady Vols' 7th championship during the 2006–2007 season, Sports Illustrated compiled a list of the 10 greatest Lady Vols basketball players of all time. In the order they were listed, they are:

First team
Chamique Holdsclaw, Forward, 1995–1999 (20.4 ppg, 8.8 rpg, 51.0 FG%) — Led the Lady Vols to three national titles, while being named the national player of the year twice as well as the Naismith Player of the Century. Holds Lady Vols records for points and rebounds, and is in the top ten for assists, steals, and blocks.
Dena Head, Guard, 1988–1992 (11.0 ppg, 4.7 rpg, 3.4 apg) — Helped Tennessee to two championships and was named an All-American in 1992. Ranks fourth all-time in assists with 457.
Kara Lawson, Guard, 1999–2003 (13.6 ppg, 4.3 rpg, 41.4 3FT%) — Second all-time at Tennessee in three-pointers (256), fourth in scoring (1,950), and fifth in assists (456). Led Tennessee to four Final Fours and was an All-American in 2003.
Candace Parker, Center, 2004–2008 (18.4 ppg, 9.0 rpg, 2.6 bpg) — 2007 Wade Trophy winner and fastest player to 1,000 points. Three-time All-American and Player of the Year 2006, 2007. Back to back National Championships.
Tamika Catchings, Forward, 1997–2001 (16.6 ppg, 7.9 rpg, 50.5 FP%) — Only player besides Holdsclaw with more than 2,000 points and 1,000 rebounds. Four-time All-American and Player of the Year in 2000. Holds Lady Vols record for most points as a freshman with 711.

Second team
Daedra Charles, Center, 1988–1991 (14.2 ppg, 8.2 rpg) — Won national title and Wade Trophy in 1991. 2-time All-American.
Holly Warlick, Guard, 1976–1980 (6.4 ppg, 4.8 apg) — 3-time All-American. Second all-time in assists.
Nikki McCray, Forward, 1991–1995 (12.4 ppg, 5.3 rpg) — 2-time All-American who led Tennessee to 4 SEC titles and 122 wins.
Semeka Randall, Guard, 1997–2001 (13.7 ppg, 5.1 rpg) — Fifth in points with 1,915 as well as 286 steals.
Bridgette Gordon, Forward, 1985–1989 (18.0 ppg, 6.7 rpg) — Two-time Kodak All-American; Led Tennessee to two titles. 2nd all-time at Tennessee in scoring with 2,460 points.

Season–by–season results

Postseason results

NCAA Division I

National Championships

AIAW Division I
The Lady Volunteers made five appearances in the AIAW National Division I basketball tournament, with a combined record of 12–6.

See also
 1987 NCAA Division I women's basketball tournament
 1989 NCAA Division I women's basketball tournament
 1991 NCAA Division I women's basketball tournament
 1996 NCAA Division I women's basketball tournament
 1997 NCAA Division I women's basketball tournament
 1998 NCAA Division I women's basketball tournament
 2007 NCAA Division I women's basketball tournament
 2008 NCAA Division I women's basketball tournament
 List of teams with the most victories in NCAA Division I women's college basketball
 Connecticut–Tennessee rivalry

References

External links